Hank Henry is a retired American soccer player who played professionally in the Major Indoor Soccer League and Continental Indoor Soccer League.

Henry attended Southern Methodist University, playing on the men’s soccer team from 1984 to 1987.  He graduated with a bachelor's degree in public relations.  In 1988, Henry attended an open tryout with the Dallas Sidekicks and was signed to the team’s developmental squad.  Over two years, he played four regular season games.  The Sidekicks released him in December 1989.  On December 22, 1989, Henry with the Atlanta Attack of the American Indoor Soccer Association for the remainder of the season.  In November 1990, the Baltimore Blast brought him in for a one-day trial.  That led the team to signing him as a backup for the 1990-1991 season.  The Blast released Henry in September 1991 and he returned to the Dallas Sidekicks for the 1991-1992 season.  During the 1991-1992 season, Henry played nine games in goal and another eight as a midfielder.  The Sidekicks again released him, but in 1994 Henry rejoined Dallas, which was no playing in the Continental Indoor Soccer League.  In 1995, he had his best season, winning all ten games he played in goal. He works at Riverbend Sandler Pools.
Hip replacement in 2015

External links
  MISL stats
 Dallas Sidekicks: Hank Henry

References

Living people
1964 births
Soccer players from Dallas
American soccer players
American Indoor Soccer Association players
Atlanta Attack players
Baltimore Blast (1980–1992) players
Continental Indoor Soccer League players
Dallas Sidekicks (original MISL) players
Dallas Sidekicks (CISL) players
Major Indoor Soccer League (1978–1992) players
SMU Mustangs men's soccer players
Association football goalkeepers
Association football midfielders